Yelena Aleksandrovna Rigert (née Priyma ; ; born 2 December 1983) is a female hammer thrower from Russia. She was born in Rostov-na-Donu, Rostov Oblast. This ranks her in the all-time top 25 for the event. She represented her country at the 2008 Summer Olympics and the 2007 World Championships in Athletics.

International competitions

References

External links 

1983 births
Living people
Sportspeople from Rostov-on-Don
Russian female hammer throwers
Olympic athletes of Russia
Athletes (track and field) at the 2008 Summer Olympics